= 21K =

21K can mean:

- A half marathon
- The NextStrain clade identifier for SARS-CoV-2 Omicron variant
- 21-karat gold
